Menherion is a farm in the parish of Stithians in Cornwall, England. Menherion is west of Stithians churchtown. Menherion is also the name of a hamlet in Cornwall.

See also

 List of farms in Cornwall

References

Farms in Cornwall